The Nightmare Years is a book by William L. Shirer, recounting his pre-WW2 years as a journalist in Nazi Germany.  

It is also a 1989 American television miniseries directed by Anthony Page. It stars Sam Waterston as Shirer, the American reporter who was stationed in Nazi Germany in the 1930s. The supporting cast consists of Marthe Keller, Kurtwood Smith, Ronald Pickup, Peter Jeffrey, Walter Gotell and Garrick Hagon.

The miniseries premiered on Turner Network Television on September 17, 1989 as a four-part miniseries and was later released on VHS. As of 2014, there are some limited versions of the series on DVD.

Cast
Sam Waterston as William L. Shirer
Marthe Keller as Tess Shirer
Kurtwood Smith as Joseph Goebbels
Ronald Pickup as Ernst Hanfstaengl
Peter Jeffrey as Norman Ebbutt
Frederick Jaeger as Wilfred Bade
Walter Gotell as Werner von Fritsch
Garrick Hagon as Edward R. Murrow
Michael Wolf as Hermann Göring
Frances Barber as Helga Bauer

Production
Principal photography took place in Budapest, Hungary. The production budget of the miniseries cost $12 million, of which TNT bought the television rights for $3 million.

Episodes

References

External links

1984 non-fiction books
Autobiographies adapted into films
American autobiographies
1989 television films
1989 films
1989 American television series debuts
1980s American television miniseries
TNT Network original films
Historical television series
Books about Nazi Germany
Television series set in the 1930s
Films directed by Anthony Page
Films set in Germany
Films shot in Hungary
Films shot in Budapest